FC Twente Vrouwen is the women's football (soccer) section of Dutch club FC Twente based in Enschede, and competes in the Vrouwen Eredivisie, the top women's league in the Netherlands.

Founded in 2007, it is one of the founding members of the Eredivisie competing in the league since its inaugural season. The club has won eight national championships, two times by winning the BeNe League, and also won the Dutch Cup twice. Its home ground is the Sportpark Slangenbeek in Hengelo with occasional matches (UEFA Women's Champions League knockout stage and other important matches) being played at the De Grolsch Veste.

History

Early years
In the first half of 2006, FC Twente became the first professional Dutch football club to take the first steps to create a women's section by appointing Mary Kok-Willemsen to set up its women's branch. Starting in 2007, the idea was to offer girls and women professional training six days a week and eventually build youth (girls) and women's teams. At that time, women's football in the Netherlands was amateur and the most talented female players were leaving for Germany and other countries with professional leagues. In November 2006 the club held a presentation of its women's football department proposal to other amateur clubs and the Netherlands women's national football team coach Vera Pauw.

On 21 January 2007 after holding a players selection trials in two locations (Hengelo and Enschede) attended by 575 candidates, the club women's section was officially established consisting of three teams, two youth teams and the senior first team. In March 2007, the Royal Dutch Football Association (KNVB)
announced FC Twente as one of the six teams to participate in the inaugural 2007–08 season of the Eredivisie Vrouwen, the professional women's Dutch league.

Eredivisie (2007–2012)

For the first Eredivisie season, coach Mary Kok-Willemsen build a 22 players squad formed with eight players coming from Be Quick '28, two players from the Belgian league and three players from the German league.

The club played its first official match on 29 August 2007, in the inaugural Eredivisie game, home at the Arke Stadion in front of 5.500 spectators, losing 2–3 against SC Heerenveen. Despite having a poor 2007–08 league season, finishing in fifth place (out of six teams), the club had a good run in the KNVB Women's Cup (Dutch Cup) winning its first trophy by beating FC Utrecht 3–1 in the Cup final.

The 2008–09 season was difficult as the team had many injured players during the entire season and the club finished the league again in fifth place (out of seven teams). At the Dutch Cup, the KNVB decided to take all Eredivisie clubs out of the competition in the Round of 16, in order to have the professional players prepared for the UEFA Women's Euro 2009.

In the 2009–10 season ten draws in twenty league matches meant the team was unable to challenge for the title and finished the league in fourth place (out of six teams). It reached the semifinals of the Dutch Cup where it lost to Ter Leede in a penalty shoot-out after a 3–3 draw.

After ending the first three league seasons in the bottom half of the table, the outcome of the 2010–11 season would prove to be different. The club brought in two American players (Ashley Nick and Caitlin Farrell), a new goalkeeper (Sari van Veenendaal) and a striker (Joyce Mijnheer). The team had a strong campaign in the league and was leading the competition by the winter break. The first championship was clinched on the last matchday in a home match at the Grolsch Veste in front of over 7.000 spectators, a 4–1 win over Willem II, ending AZ Alkmaar's three-year championship hegemony. Along with the title the team qualified for next season's UEFA Women's Champions League. In the Dutch Cup, the team was eliminated in the quarterfinals.

There were changes ahead of the 2011–12 season, coach Mary Kok-Willemsen took on a different role at the club and John van Miert was appointed as the new coach. The league start was good, the team took all points available from the first four matches and at the winter break was second, one point behind leaders ADO Den Haag. During that break John van Miert took a different function at the club and Arjan Veurink became the team's coach. In the second half of the season the league leaders proved very strong and Twente finished second place, 14 points behind ADO Den Haag. The club debut in European competitions in the 2011–12 UEFA Women's Champions League came on 28 September 2011 at the De Adelaarshorst in Deventer, a 0–2 first leg defeat to Russian champions WFC Rossiyanka in the Round of 32, the second leg was also won by the Russians (1–0). The team also reached the Dutch Cup semifinals that season and played the BeNe Super Cup (a match between the Dutch and Belgian league champions) losing 1–4 against Standard Liège.

BeNe League (2012–2015)
In 2012 the BeNe League was created when the Dutch and Belgian leagues merged into a single one. Despite the departure of players Ashley Nick, Blakely Mattern, Joyce Mijnheer and Lorca Van De Putte in pre-season and Courtney Goodson in the winter break, the first team brought in Sherida Spitse and Jill Roord. The 2012–13 BeNe League was played in two stages, the first had a group of eight Dutch teams (BeNe League Orange) and FC Twente topped the group without losing a match. The second stage had the top four teams of the Dutch group and the top four teams from the Belgian group forming a new group (BeNe League A) to play for the championship. The team won the Dutch championship (awarded to the best Dutch team in the BeNe League) on 10 May 2013, achieving Champions League participation in the following season. It became the first BeNe League champions on 25 May 2013 in the last round of the season in a straight championship match against Standard Liège, which came into the match one point ahead of FC Twente. At the Grolsch Veste in front of 9.000 spectators, FC Twente came from behind to win the match 3–1. The Tukkers narrowly missed a double, losing the Dutch Cup final on penalties against ADO Den Haag.

The 2013–14 BeNe League season was played with all 15 teams (eight Dutch and seven Belgian) into a single group. Despite many players changes during the season and the exclusion of FC Utrecht from the league due to bankruptcy in the winter break, the club had a strong league performance, winning the Dutch championship (as best Dutch club in the BeNe League) on 16 May 2014 and eventually winning the BeNe League title on 6 June 2014 after a 7–0 win against Club Brugge. The team negotiated well the qualifying round of the 2013–14 UEFA Women's Champions League, winning two and losing one match to reach the Round of 32 where they drew French champions Olympique Lyon, which proved to be too strong winning both legs by a 10–0 aggregate. The team reached the Dutch Cup semifinal where it was beaten by Ajax 0–2.

The club finished second in the 2014–15 BeNe League, two points behind Standard Liège, despite missing a third BeNe League title it won the Dutch championship (as best Dutch club in the BeNe League) for the third consecutive year on 28 April 2015 after a 4–0 win over Anderlecht At the 2014–15 UEFA Women's Champions League the club drew French Paris Saint-Germain as opponents in the Round of 32 and lost both legs (1–2 and 0–1). The club won its second Dutch Cup by defeating Ajax 3–2 in the final.

Eredivisie (2015–)

In 2015 the BeNe League was dissolved and the Eredivisie was re-introduced. The club won the Dutch championship for the fourth consecutive year after a 3–0 win over PEC Zwolle on 20 May 2016. At the 2015–16 UEFA Women's Champions League, three wins in the qualification round got the team to the Round of 32, being drawn to play against German Bayern Munich. After a 1–1 first leg draw at home in the Grolsch Veste, the team drew the second leg 2–2 in Germany, advancing on away goals rule to the Round of 16 for the first time. The next opponents Spanish Barcelona won both legs (0–1 and 0–1) in the Round of 16. In the Dutch Cup, the team was eliminated by Ajax on penalty shoot-out, following a 0–0 draw in the quarterfinals.

Ahead of the 2016–17 season, Tommy Stroot was appointed as the first team coach. The club ended the 2016–17 Eredivisie as runners-up behind Ajax. At the 2016–17 UEFA Women's Champions League, three wins in the qualification round got the team to the Round of 32, being drawn to play against Czech Sparta Praha. In the first leg at home, the club won its first Champions League main tournament match by 2–0, and after a 3–1 win on the second leg advanced to the Round of 16 for the second time. The club next faced Spanish Barcelona for the second year in succession at the Round of 16, after losing both legs (0–1 and 0–4) it was eliminated from the competition. In the Dutch Cup the team lost 2–3 to PEC Zwolle in the quarterfinals.

Competitive record

Eredivisie / BeNe League

a=at moment of abandonment due to Covid

a=national champion by virtue of being the highest ranked Dutch club
b=at moment of abandonment due to Covid

UEFA Women's Champions League
All results (away, home and aggregate) list Twente Enschede's goal tally first.

a First leg.

Honours
National
 Dutch League champion
 Winners (8): 2011, 2013*, 2014*, 2015*, 2016, 2019, 2021, 2022
 BeNe League
 Winners (2): 2013, 2014
 KNVB Women's Cup
 Winners (2): 2008, 2015
 Eredivisie Cup 
 Winners (1): 2021-22
 BeNe Super Cup
 Runner-up (1): 2011

*During the BeNe League period (2012 to 2015), the highest placed Dutch team is considered as national champion by the Royal Dutch Football Association.

Players

Current squad

Former players

Internationals (former and current players)
  Netherlands: Eshly Bakker, Lineth Beerensteyn, Marloes de Boer, Marije Brummel, Kerstin Casparij, Anouk Dekker, Daphne van Domselaar, Kayleigh van Dooren, Caitlin Dijkstra, Kika van Es, Cheyenne van den Goorbergh, Stefanie van der Gragt, Maayke Heuver, Ellen Jansen, Renate Jansen, Fenna Kalma, Danique Kerkdijk, Myrthe Moorrees, Marthe Munsterman, Sisca Folkertsma, Marisa Olislagers, Marlous Pieëte, Mirte Roelvink, Jill Roord, Shanice van de Sanden, Sylvia Smit, Sherida Spitse, Sari van Veenendaal, Kirsten van de Ven, Ashleigh Weerden, Lynn Wilms, Siri Worm
  Belgium: Yana Daniëls, Nicky Evrard, Lenie Onzia, Lorca Van De Putte, Jarne Teulings, Elena Dhont
  Norway: Andrine Tomter
  Switzerland: Nora Häuptle
  Slovenia: Kristina Erman
  Tunisia: Sabrine Ellouzi

Coaching staff

|}

Head coaches
  Mary Kok-Willemsen (2007–2011)
  John van Miert (2011–2012)
  Arjan Veurink (2012–2016)
  Tommy Stroot (2016–2021)
  Robert de Pauw (2021-2022)
  Joran Pot (2022-)

Broadcasting
As of the 2020–21 season, league matches played on Sunday are broadcast on Fox Sports. Public service broadcaster NOS occasionally broadcasts some Sunday games live and provides game highlights during the Studio Sport programme.

References

External links
 
 

FC Twente (women)
Women's football clubs in the Netherlands
BeNe League teams
Eredivisie (women) teams
2007 establishments in the Netherlands
Association football clubs established in 2007
Football clubs in Enschede